The AK-100 family is a series of Kalashnikov rifles, based upon the AK-74M, intended for export sales. The family of rifles offers the AK-74M system, in multiple cartridges and lengths.

AK-100 series 

The original AK-100 series rifles were introduced in 1994 and are categorized by all having black polymer handguards, folding polymer stocks, and use of AK-74M internal systems. Parts are highly interchangeable.

Notably, while the pattern would imply that the AK-100 series rifle chambered for 5.45x39mm would be the AK-105, and that the 5.45 carbine would be the AK-106, the AK-105 designation skipped the 100 series 5.45 rifle (that already existed as the 74M,) and went straight to the 5.45 carbine. Despite the AK-100 series being built off the AK-74M, rather than the 74M being the start of the series as the AK-100 or the AK-101, they decided that they would keep its name, and instead skip "AK-100" and attribute AK-101 to a completely different rifle. Additionally, there is no AK-106. This is likely to separate the versions using the BARS system, to make it clear that while they are 100 series rifles overall, they are somewhat their own subseries, however it could be possible that the AK-74M could have the alternative designation of AK-106

Even with those differences all of the rifles are made to similar specifications.

 Both long rifles had a barrel length of 415 mm, and all the carbines had a barrel length of 314 mm.
 Both long rifles (unloaded) weighted 3.6 kg, and all the carbines: 3.2 kg.
 All the rifles had a selector for with: safe, semi auto, or full auto. Also, both long rifles also had a variant with 3 round burst called AK-10X-3 and a semi auto only variant called AK-10X-1

Rifles in the 100 series have been exported to and/or adopted by a variety of countries, notably: Armenia, Cyprus, Serbia, Syria, Uruguay, Iran, Pakistan, Saudi Arabia, Indonesia, and Venezuela.

The AK-105 has also seen some domestic use, filling a niche role as a middle ground between the AK-74M and AKS-74U.

Related development 

Later Kalashnikov started offering the AK-107 / AK-108 / AK-109 models. Externally they are very similar to the AK-100 series (with some minor differences) and are offered in the same calibers. Internally they use a radically different gas system and incorporate the Balanced Automatics Recoil System (BARS).

AK-100M/200 series 
The AK-100M/AK-200 rifle family was initially conceived around 2009 as an improved variant of the basic AK-100 series. Most improvements centered on ergonomic improvements and mounting systems for accessories. The development of the AK-100M/AK-200 family was stopped around 2011 but resumed around 2016. In 2017, Kalashnikov unveiled the modernised versions of the AK-100 family of rifles. The AK-200 series are somewhat heavier and less advanced compared to the AK-12 family, but also cheaper.

As of 2018, the AK-200 series rifles are offered for export sales and for domestic law enforcement users in Russia. The AK-200 series are based on the AK-100 series and the AK-12. They can be chambered in 5.45×39mm, 5.56×45mm NATO and 7.62×39mm, and use a barrel and gas system assembly and iron sights line similar to that of the AK-74M/AK-100 rifle family. Improvements added from the AK-12 include Picatinny rails, a new pistol grip, a new adjustable buttstock and a new flash hider. They feed from 30-round magazines, and are compatible with drum magazines from the RPK and RPK-74.

The models of the AK-200 series are:

On 3 March 2019, Russia and India inaugurated Indo-Russia Rifles in Uttar Pradesh, India to produce AK-203 assault rifles. However, no contract had been signed then or rifles produced because of pricing disagreements. India signed a contract in August 2021 to directly import 70,000 AK-203 rifles from Russia. Russia and India on December 6, 2021, finally signed a contract on the delivery of over 600,000 7.62mm AK-203 assault rifles that will be produced on India's soil to the republic's Defense Ministry.

References

External links
 Izhmash—manufacturer's website of the 5.45 mm Kalashnikov assault rifles AK74M, AK105
 Modern Firearms

5.45×39mm assault rifles
5.56×45mm NATO assault rifles
7.62×39mm assault rifles
Kalashnikov derivatives
Assault rifles of Russia
Kalashnikov Concern products